The 2020–21 Swiss Cup is the 96th season of Switzerland's annual football cup competition. The competition began on 29 August 2020 with the first games of Round 1 and ended on 24 May 2021.

BSC Young Boys are the title holders.

Participating clubs
All teams from 2019–20 Super League and 2019–20 Challenge League. Due to the COVID-19 pandemic, only 18 slots (instead of 45) were allocated to teams from lower divisions. Those teams had to qualify through separate qualifying rounds within their leagues. Reserve teams and A-teams from Liechtenstein are not allowed in the competition, the latter only enter the 2020–21 Liechtenstein Cup.

Teams in bold are still active in the competition.

TH Title holders.

Round 1
Teams from Super League and Challenge League received a bye in this round. In a match, the home advantage was granted to the team from the lower league, if applicable. Teams in bold continue to the next round of the competition.

|-
| colspan="3" style="background:#9cc;"|29 August 2020

|-
| colspan="3" style="background:#9cc;"|30 August 2020

|-
| colspan="3" style="background:#9cc;"|31 August 2020

|}

Round 2
Teams engaged in UEFA competitions received a bye in this round. Teams from Super League were seeded. In a match, the home advantage was granted to the team from the lower league, if applicable. Teams in bold continue to the next round of the competition.

|-
| colspan="3" style="background:#9cc;"|11 September 2020

|-
| colspan="3" style="background:#9cc;"|12 September 2020

|-
| colspan="3" style="background:#9cc;"|13 September 2020

|-
| colspan="3" style="background:#9cc;"|26 September 2020

|}

Round 3
In a match, the home advantage was granted to the team from the lower league, if applicable. Teams in bold continue to the next round of the competition.

|-
|colspan="3" style="background-color:#99CCCC"|10 February 2021

|-
|colspan="3" style="background-color:#99CCCC"|17 February 2021

|-
|colspan="3" style="background-color:#99CCCC"|24 February 2021

|-
|colspan="3" style="background-color:#99CCCC"|10 March 2021

|-
|colspan="3" style="background-color:#99CCCC"|7 April 2021

|-
|colspan="3" style="background-color:#99CCCC"|8 April 2021

|}

Quarter-finals
In a match, the home advantage was granted to the team from the lower league, if applicable. Teams in bold continue to the next round of the competition.

|-
|colspan="3" style="background-color:#99CCCC"|6 April 2021

|-
|colspan="3" style="background-color:#99CCCC"|13 April 2021
{{OneLegResult|FC Lugano (1)||1–2 |FC Luzern (1)}}
|-
|colspan="3" style="background-color:#99CCCC"|14 April 2021

|}

Semi-finals
Teams in bold continue to the next round of the competition.

|-
|colspan="3" style="background-color:#99CCCC"|4 May 2021

|-
|colspan="3" style="background-color:#99CCCC"|5 May 2021

|}

Final

|-
|colspan="3" style="background-color:#99CCCC"|24 May 2021

|}

References

External links
 Official site

Swiss Cup seasons
Swiss Cup
Cup
Swiss Cup